Acanthurus leucopareius is a sub-tropical fish known commonly as the whitebar surgeonfish or the head-band surgeonfish. It is somewhat commercial in fisheries and is used in aquariums. It was first named by Jenkins in 1903.

References

Acanthurus
Fish of Hawaii
Fish described in 1903
Taxa named by Oliver Peebles Jenkins